Qaleh-ye Seyyed Ahmad (also Romanized as Qal‘eh-ye Seyyed Aḩmad) is a village in Piran Rural District, in the Central District of Piranshahr County, West Azerbaijan Province, Iran. At the 2006 census, its population was 47, in 5 families.

References 

Populated places in Piranshahr County